Bastien Vergnes-Taillefer (born 13 June 1997) is a French rugby union player. He currently plays as a loose forward, mostly as an eighthman, for Bordeaux Bègles in the Top 14.

Career
Coming from Haute-Garonne, Bastien Vergnes-Taillefer became a professional player with Colomiers and then signed for Bordeaux Bègles, discovering the Top 14.

He was called by Fabien Galthié to the French national team for the first time in June 2022, for the summer tour of Japan.

References

External links
 Union Bordeaux Bègles
 EPCR
 All.Rugby
 It's Rugby

French rugby union players
Rugby union number eights
Rugby union flankers
US Colomiers players
Union Bordeaux Bègles players
Sportspeople from Haute-Garonne
Living people
1997 births